Fisterra is a comarca in the Galician Province of A Coruña. The overall population of this local region is 21,483 (2019).

Municipalities
Cee, Corcubión, Dumbría, Fisterra and Muxía.

References

Comarcas of the Province of A Coruña